The following lists events that happened during 1899 in Australia.

Incumbents

Governors of the Australian colonies
Governor of New South Wales – Henry Brand, 2nd Viscount Hampden (until 5 March), then William Lygon, 7th Earl Beauchamp (from 18 May)
Governor of Queensland – Charles Cochrane-Baillie, 2nd Baron Lamington
Governor of South Australia – Sir Thomas Buxton, 3rd Baronet (until 29 March), then Hallam Tennyson, 2nd Baron Tennyson (from 10 April)
Governor of Tasmania – Jenico Preston, 14th Viscount Gormanston
Governor of Victoria – Thomas Brassey, 1st Earl Brassey
Governor of Western Australia – Sir Gerard Smith

Premiers of the Australian colonies
Premier of New South Wales – George Reid (until 13 September) then William Lyne
Premier of Queensland – James Dickson (until 1 December), Anderson Dawson (until 7 December) then Robert Philp
Premier of South Australia – Charles Kingston (until 1 December), Vaiben Louis Solomon (until 8 December) then Frederick Holder
Premier of Tasmania – Edward Braddon (until 12 October) then Elliott Lewis
Premier of Victoria – George Turner (until 5 December) then Allan McLean
Premier of Western Australia – John Forrest

Events
 1 January – The Police Regulation Act 1898 is enacted in Tasmania, unifying several small regional police forces to form the Tasmanian Police Force.
 22 January – Leaders of the six Australian colonies meet in Melbourne to discuss confederation.
 4 March – Cyclone Mahina strikes Bathurst Bay in Queensland. Approximately 400 persons are killed, and the pearling fleet is sunk. A storm surge of up to 14 metres sweeps 5 kilometres inland.
 24 April – The 1,280-ton barque Loch Sloy hits rocks off Kangaroo Island and sinks, killing 31 persons.
 8 December – An electric tram service commences in Sydney, along George Street from the railway to Circular Quay.
 Colonial soldiers leave to fight in the Second Boer War.

Arts and literature

 8 October – The word "wowser" is first used by John Norton, editor of the Melbourne Truth newspaper.
 George Washington Lambert wins the Wynne Prize for landscape painting or figure sculpture for his landscape Across the Blacksoil Plains
 Dot and the Kangaroo, a children's book by Ethel Pedley, is published.
 On Our Selection by Steele Rudd is published.

Sport
 Merriwee wins the Melbourne Cup
 Victoria wins the Sheffield Shield

Births
 7 January – John Collins, Chief of Naval Staff and High Commissioner to New Zealand (died 1989)
 17 January – Nevil Shute, writer (died 1960)
 21 January – Ernestine Hill, travel writer (died 1972)
 22 February – Ian Clunies Ross, scientist (died 1959)
 7 March – Eddie Ward, politician (died 1963)
 3 September – Frank Macfarlane Burnet, biologist and Nobel Prize winner (died 1985)
 24 September – William Dobell, artist, sculptor and painter (died 1970)
 21 October – Herb Steinohrt, rugby league footballer (died 1985)
 14 December – Frank McMillan, rugby league footballer and coach (died 1966)

Date unknown 
 Olga Agnew, child actress (died 1987)

Deaths
 21 February - George Bowen (born 1821), Governor of Queensland
 13 April - James Service (born 1823), former Premier of Victoria
 25 September - Elizabeth Tripp (born 1809), educator

References

 
Australia
Years of the 19th century in Australia